The 2014 West Lancashire Borough Council election took place on 22 May 2014 to elect members of  West Lancashire Borough Council in Lancashire, England, as part of the wider 2014 United Kingdom local elections and with the United Kingdom component of the 2014 European Parliament election on the same day.  One third of the council is up for election.

Results
The council became No Overall Control.

Voters-70,195
Turnout-26478
Percentage-37.72%

By ward

Ashurst

Aughton and Downholland

Aughton Park

Burscough East

Burscough West

Derby

Hesketh with Becconsall

Knowsley

Moorside

Newburgh

North Meols

Parbold

Scarisbrick

Scott

Skelmersdale South

Tanhouse

Tarleton (2 Seats)

Up Holland

References

2014 English local elections
2014
2010s in Lancashire